Cities and towns under the oblast's jurisdiction:
Kaluga (Калуга) (administrative center)
city okrugs:
Leninsky (Ленинский)
with 3 rural okrugs under the city okrug's jurisdiction.
Moskovsky (Московский)
with 3 rural okrugs under the city okrug's jurisdiction.
Oktyabrsky (Октябрьский)
with 2 rural okrugs under the city okrug's jurisdiction.
Kirov (Киров)
Lyudinovo (Людиново)
Obninsk (Обнинск)
Districts:
Babyninsky (Бабынинский)
with 14 selsovets under the district's jurisdiction.
Baryatinsky (Барятинский)
with 14 selsovets under the district's jurisdiction.
Borovsky (Боровский)
Towns under the district's jurisdiction:
Balabanovo (Балабаново)
Borovsk (Боровск)
Urban-type settlements under the district's jurisdiction:
Yermolino (Ермолино)
with 9 selsovets under the district's jurisdiction.
Duminichsky (Думиничский)
Urban-type settlements under the district's jurisdiction:
Duminichi (Думиничи)
with 13 selsovets under the district's jurisdiction.
Dzerzhinsky (Дзержинский)
Towns under the district's jurisdiction:
Kondrovo (Кондрово)
Urban-type settlements under the district's jurisdiction:
Kurovskoy (Куровской)
Polotnyany Zavod (Полотняный Завод)
Pyatovsky (Пятовский)
Tovarkovo (Товарково)
with 19 selsovets under the district's jurisdiction.
Ferzikovsky (Ферзиковский)
Urban-type settlements under the district's jurisdiction:
Dugna (Дугна)
with 16 selsovets under the district's jurisdiction.
Iznoskovsky (Износковский)
with 10 selsovets under the district's jurisdiction.
Khvastovichsky (Хвастовичский)
with 17 selsovets under the district's jurisdiction.
Kirovsky (Кировский)
with 12 selsovets under the district's jurisdiction.
Kozelsky (Козельский)
Towns under the district's jurisdiction:
Kozelsk (Козельск)
Sosensky (Сосенский)
with 14 selsovets under the district's jurisdiction.
Kuybyshevsky (Куйбышевский)
with 12 selsovets under the district's jurisdiction.
Lyudinovsky (Людиновский)
with 10 selsovets under the district's jurisdiction.
Maloyaroslavetsky (Малоярославецкий)
Towns under the district's jurisdiction:
Maloyaroslavets (Малоярославец)
with 17 selsovets under the district's jurisdiction.
Medynsky (Медынский)
Towns under the district's jurisdiction:
Medyn (Медынь)
with 11 selsovets under the district's jurisdiction.
Meshchovsky (Мещовский)
Towns under the district's jurisdiction:
Meshchovsk (Мещовск)
with 17 selsovets under the district's jurisdiction.
Mosalsky (Мосальский)
Towns under the district's jurisdiction:
Mosalsk (Мосальск)
with 18 selsovets under the district's jurisdiction.
Peremyshlsky (Перемышльский)
with 16 selsovets under the district's jurisdiction.
Spas-Demensky (Спас-Деменский)
Towns under the district's jurisdiction:
Spas-Demensk (Спас-Деменск)
with 12 selsovets under the district's jurisdiction.
Sukhinichsky (Сухиничский)
Towns under the district's jurisdiction:
Sukhinichi (Сухиничи)
Urban-type settlements under the district's jurisdiction:
Seredeysky (Середейский)
with 17 selsovets under the district's jurisdiction.
Tarussky (Тарусский)
Towns under the district's jurisdiction:
Tarusa (Таруса)
with 10 selsovets under the district's jurisdiction.
Ulyanovsky (Ульяновский)
with 5 territorial okrugs under the district's jurisdiction.
Yukhnovsky (Юхновский)
Towns under the district's jurisdiction:
Yukhnov (Юхнов)
with 13 selsovets under the district's jurisdiction.
Zhizdrinsky (Жиздринский)
Towns under the district's jurisdiction:
Zhizdra (Жиздра)
with 11 selsovets under the district's jurisdiction.
Zhukovsky (Жуковский)
Towns under the district's jurisdiction:
Zhukov (Жуков)
Urban-type settlements under the district's jurisdiction:
Belousovo (Белоусово)
Kremyonki (Кременки)
with 12 selsovets under the district's jurisdiction.

References

Kaluga Oblast
Kaluga Oblast